The Tikych is a short river, just  long, in Cherkasy Oblast, Ukraine.  It is formed by the confluence of its source rivers Hnyly Tikych and Hirsky Tikych, and flows to its own confluence with the Velyka Vys at Skaleva (Holovanivsk Raion), which forms the Syniukha.  The Syniukha will flow  to the Southern Bug.

References

Rivers of Cherkasy Oblast